Joyner Michael White (born December 18, 1938) is an American former professional baseball player. Primarily an outfielder, White appeared in Major League Baseball for all or parts of three seasons (1963–65) for the Houston Colt .45s / Astros. He is the son of the late Jo-Jo White, a former MLB outfielder and coach.

White attended American River Junior College, Sacramento, California, and signed with the Cleveland Indians in 1958; his father was a Cleveland scout and coach that season. But White suffered a serious knee injury in a 1958 intrasquad game and his career was nearly ended before it began. Despite constant therapy, he ran with a pronounced limp. White was able to play 126 minor league games in 1959 and 127 more in 1960. During the latter season, he batted .304 with 132 hits for the Reading Indians of the Class A Eastern League. But the Indians released him on December 8, 1960.

However, baseball was in the process of adding four new expansion teams during the 1961 and 1962 seasons. He moved from third base to the outfield and later became a second baseman as well. After one year in the Angels' farm system, he was drafted by another expansion team, the Colt .45s, during the winter before their debut  season. White batted .294 and .324 in successive seasons in the high minors before making his debut with the Colt .45s in September . He collected two singles in seven at bats over three MLB games.

White spent the entire  campaign with Houston, primarily as a center fielder, and batted .271 with 76 hits in 89 games. He was hitless in nine at bats and returned to the minor leagues for the remainder of his career. He retired in 1969.

See also
 List of second generation MLB players

References

External links
, or Retrosheet
Pura Pelota (Venezuelan Winter League)

1938 births
Living people
American expatriate baseball players in Venezuela
American River Beavers baseball players
American River College alumni
Baseball players from Michigan
Burlington Indians players (1958–1964)
Dallas Rangers players
Dallas–Fort Worth Spurs players
Estrellas Orientales (VPBL) players
Houston Astros players
Houston Colt .45s players
Major League Baseball center fielders
Major League Baseball second basemen
Mobile Bears players
Navegantes del Magallanes players
Oklahoma City 89ers players
Reading Indians players
San Antonio Bullets players
Seattle Angels players
Tacoma Cubs players